Meclinertant (SR-48692) is a drug which acts as a selective, non-peptide antagonist at the neurotensin receptor NTS1, and was the first non-peptide antagonist developed for this receptor. It is used in scientific research to explore the interaction between neurotensin and other neurotransmitters in the brain, and produces anxiolytic, anti-addictive and memory-impairing effects in animal studies.

References

External links
 Meclinertant - AdisInsight

Adamantanes
Pyrazoles
Quinolines
Chloroarenes
Phenol ethers